Webster Lee Harrison (March 31, 1940 – June 17, 2018) was an American football player and coach. He served as the head football coach at Bates College in Lewiston, Maine from 1978 to 1991. He also served as the school's head men's lacrosse coach from 1978 to 1995, tallying a mark of 124–113.

References

1940 births
2018 deaths
Bates Bobcats football coaches
Bates Bobcats men's lacrosse coaches
Bates Bobcats football players
College track and field coaches in the United States
People from Torrington, Connecticut
Players of American football from Connecticut